Marc Rosset was the defending champion, but lost in the first round this year.

Wayne Ferreira won the tournament, beating Pete Sampras 7–6(7–2), 5–7, 6–3 in the final.

Seeds

Draw

Finals

Top half

Bottom half

References
 Main Draw

1995 ATP Tour